Rick Woodford (1948–2006) was a former Newfoundland and Labrador MHA and cabinet minister.

Woodford served ten years as mayor of Cormack, also serving as a director for the Newfoundland Federation of Municipalities. He had been MHA for Humber Valley for 18 years, and became minister of forest resources and agrifoods in the Liberal government of Roger Grimes. He sat as a Progressive Conservative from 1985 to 1996, until running as a Liberal in 1996. He underwent surgery for a brain tumour in 2001 and retired in 2003 due to the pain and side effects associated with follow-on treatments.

He died in April 2006 in a canoeing incident, along with his female companion. The bodies were found on April 16 in Birchy Lake, near Cormack.

Electoral record

|-

|-

|}

|-

|-

|}

|-

|-

|-

|}

|-

|-

|}

|-

|-

|-

|}

References

Progressive Conservative Party of Newfoundland and Labrador MHAs
Liberal Party of Newfoundland and Labrador MHAs
1948 births
2006 deaths
Sport deaths in Canada
Accidental deaths in Newfoundland and Labrador
Mayors of places in Newfoundland and Labrador
21st-century Canadian politicians